The 2009 Three National Figure Skating Championships included the Czech Republic, Slovakia, and Poland. The event was held on December 4–6, 2008 in Třinec, Czech Republic. Medals were awarded in the disciplines of men's singles, ladies' singles, pair skating, and ice dancing on the senior, junior, and novice levels.

The three national championships were held simultaneously and the results were then split by country. The top three skaters from each country formed their national podiums. This was the third consecutive season that the Czech and Slovak Championships were held simultaneously, and the first in which Poland also participated.

In the senior pairs event, Kemp / King of United Kingdom competed as guest skaters.

Medals summary

Czech Republic

Slovakia

Poland

Senior results

Men

Ladies

Pairs

Ice dancing

Junior results

Pairs

 WD = Withdrawn

Ice dancing

Novice results

Pairs

Ice dancing

External links
 2009 Three National Championships results
 

Czech, Slovak, And Polish Figure Skating Championships, 2009
2008 in figure skating
Czech Figure Skating Championships
Slovak Figure Skating Championships
Polish Figure Skating Championships
2008 in Polish sport
2008 in Czech sport
2008 in Slovak sport
Czech Republic–Slovakia relations